In computer science, and more precisely regarding data structures, a persistent array is a persistent data structure with properties similar to a (non-persistent) array. That is then, after a value's update in a persistent array, there exists two persistent arrays. One persistent array in which the update is taken into account, and one which is equal to the array before the update.

Difference between persistent arrays and arrays
An array
 is a data structure,
with a fixed number n of elements . It is expected that, given the array ar and an
index , the value  can be
retrieved quickly. This operation is called a
look-up. Furthermore, given the array ar, an index
 and a new value v, a new array ar2 with
content  can
be created quickly. This operation is called an update.  The
main difference between persistent and non-persistent arrays being
that, in non-persistent arrays, the array ar is destroyed during
the creation of ar2.

For example, consider the following pseudocode.
 array = [0, 0, 0]
 updated_array = array.update(0, 8)
 other_array = array.update(1, 3) last_array = updated_array.update(2, 5)
At the end of execution, the value of array is still [0, 0, 0], the
value of update_array is [8, 0, 0], the value of other_arrayis [0, 3, 0] and the value of last_array is [0, 8, 5].

There exists two kinds of persistent arrays. A persistent array may be
either partially or fully persistent. A fully persistent
array may be updated an arbitrary number of times while a partially
persistent array may be updated at most once. In our previous example,
if array were only partially persistent, the creation ofother_array would be forbidden, however, the creation of
last_array would still be valid. Indeed, updated_array is an array
distinct from array and has never been updated before the creation
of last_array.

Implementations
Many implementations of persistent arrays exists. In this section, the
positive natural number n will always be the size of the
persistent array.

Three implementations are discussed below. The first ones are the
easiest one to implement, while the last ones are the more efficient.

Using purely functional data structures
The simplest implementation of a fully persistent array of size nconsist in using an arbitrary persistent map, whose entry are the
numbers from 0 to n − 1. Such a data structure may be, for
example, a balanced tree. However, looking up an element in such a
data structure would take logarithmic time. One of the main
interest of array is that operations are executed in constant
time. While it is impossible to create a data structures in which
every operations takes constant time, the following operations would allow look-up to be more efficient, at least on the last version of the structures.

Using an array, and a tree of modifications
A fully persistent array may be implemented using an array and the
so-called Baker's trick.   This implementation is used in the OCaml module parray.ml by Jean-Christophe Filliâtre.

In order to define this implementation, a few other definitions must
be given. An initial array is an array which is not generated by
an update on another array. A child of an array ar is an
array of the form ar.update(i,v), and ar is the parent
of ar.update(i,v). A descendant of an array ar is eitherar or the descendant of a child of ar. The initial array
of an array ar is either ar if ar is initial, or it is the
initial array of the parent of ar. That is, the initial array ofar is the unique array init such that , with ar initial
and  an arbitrary sequence of indexes and
 an arbitrary sequence of value. Afamily of array is thus a set of arrays containing an initial
array and all of its descendants. Finally, the tree of a family of
arrays is the tree whose nodes are the
arrays, and with an edge e from ar to each of its childar.update(i,v).

A persistent array using the Baker's trick consists into a pair with
an actual array called array and the tree of arrays.  This tree
admits an arbitrary root - not necessarily the initial array.  The
root may be moved to an arbitrary node of the tree. Changing the root
from root to an arbitrary node ar takes time proportional in
the depth of ar. That is, in the distance between root andar. Similarly, looking up a value takes time proportional to the
distance between the array and the root of its family. Thus, if the
same array ar may be look-up multiple time, it is more efficient
to move the root to ar before doing the look-up. Finally updating
an array only takes constant time.

Technically, given two adjacent arrays ar1 and ar2, withar1 closer to the root than ar2, the edge from ar1 toar2 is labelled by (i,ar2[i]), where i the only position
whose value differ between ar1 and ar2.

Accessing an element i of an array ar is done as follows. Ifar is the root, then ar[i] equals root[i]. Otherwise, lete the edge leaving ar toward the root. If the label of eis (i,v) then ar[i] equals v. Otherwise, let ar2 be
the other node of the edge e. Then ar[i] equalsar2[i]. The computation of ar2[i] being done recursively using
the same definition.

The creation of ar.update(i,v) consists in adding a new nodear2 to the tree, and an edge e from ar to ar2 labelled
by (i,v).

Finally, moving the root to a node ar is done as follows. Ifar is already the root, there is nothing to do. Otherwise, lete the edge leaving ar toward the current root, (i,v) its
label and ar2 the other end of e. Moving the root to ar is
done by first moving the root to ar2, changing the label of eto (i, ar2[i]), and changing array[i] to v.

Log-log-time
In 1989, Dietz
gave an implementation of fully persistent arrays such that
look-up and updates can be done in
-time, and space
, with m the number of arrays and n'' the
number of element in an array. This implementation
is optimal for look-up, according to the so-called cell-probe model.

Note however that this implementation is far more complex than the two
mentioned above, and thus won't be described in this article.

References
.

Articles with example pseudocode
Arrays